The UCI Men's scratch event of the 2016 UCI Track Cycling World Championships was held on 2 March 2016. Sebastián Mora won the gold medal.

Results
The race was started at 19:20.

References

Men's scratch
UCI Track Cycling World Championships – Men's scratch